, born as , is a fictional character and the protagonist of the Sword Art Online series of light novels written by Reki Kawahara. Known by a portmanteau of his name,   which is his user name in the Sword Art Online video game which the series are partially set in.

Kirito is a teenager who was chosen as one of 1,000 beta testers for a new virtual reality video game: Sword Art Online. After the game is released to the general public, he and the rest of the 10,000 players discover that they are unable to log out and are trapped in the simulation unless they manage to beat the game. In the anime adaptation, Kirito is voiced in Japanese by Yoshitsugu Matsuoka and in English by Bryce Papenbrook.

Creation and conception

In an interview with Sword Art Online series creator Reki Kawahara, they wrote the series to change popular opinion of online gaming; viewing it not a social ill or just an escape from real life, and thus decided to show games in a more positive light in his light novels. He stated that he does not usually put aspects of himself into his characters, he did note that "neither of us are good at forming parties. We [both] tend to play solo in these games a lot." When asked about Kirito using a sword in a gun-based game during the Gun Gale Online arc, Kawahara responded that the energy sword in Halo can be the most powerful weapon if used properly.

In the anime adaptation, Kirito is voiced in Japanese by Yoshitsugu Matsuoka and in English by Bryce Papenbrook. In an interview with Matsuoka on the similarities between him and his character, Matsuoka opinioned that "there's only one chance" for success in both acting and for Kirito in the game universe. They also noted that Kirito eventually had to "pull people along" and "pave the way for others" like themselves.

Appearances
As the main protagonist of Sword Art Online, Kazuto "Kirito" Kirigaya, is one of 1,000 testers in the previous closed beta of Sword Art Online (SAO), a Massively Multiplayer Online Role-Playing Game played with a virtual reality headset, known as the NerveGear. The helmet stimulates the user's five senses via their brain, allowing players to experience and control their in-game characters with their minds. He later joins the official version of the game where he becomes one of the 10,000 players to log into the game on opening. The players only discover that they are unable to log out and leave the game. Kayaba, the games creator, appears and tells the players that they must beat the game to escape. Aincrad, a steel castle which is the setting of SAO, has 100 floors, which need to be climbed and completed to finish the game. Those who suffer in-game deaths or forcibly remove the NerveGear will suffer real-life deaths.

With the advantage of previous VR gaming experience and a drive to protect other beta testers from discrimination, he isolates himself from the greater groups and plays the game alone, bearing the mantle of "beater", a portmanteau of "beta tester" and "cheater". As the players progress through the game Kirito eventually befriends a young girl named Asuna Yuuki, forming a relationship with and later marrying her in-game. After the duo discover the identity of Kayaba's secret ID, who was playing as the leader of the guild Asuna joined in, they confront and destroy him, freeing themselves and the other players from the game.

In the real world, Kazuto discovers that 300 SAO players, including Asuna, remain trapped in their NerveGear. As he goes to the hospital to see Asuna, he meets Shouzou Yuuki, Asuna's father, who is asked by an associate of his, Nobuyuki Sugou, to make a decision, which Sugou later reveals to be his marriage with Asuna, angering Kazuto. Several hours later, he is informed by Agil, another SAO survivor, that a figure similar to Asuna was spotted on "The World Tree" in another VRMMORPG cyberspace called Alfheim Online (ALO). Assisted in-game by his cousin Suguha "Leafa" Kirigaya and Yui, a navigation pixie (originally an AI from SAO), he quickly learns that the trapped players in ALO are part of a plan conceived by Sugou to perform illegal experiments on their minds. The goal is to create the perfect mind-control for financial gain and to subjugate Asuna, whom he intends to marry in the real world, to assume control of her family's corporation. Kirito eventually stops the experiment and rescues the remaining 300 SAO players, foiling Sugou's plans. Before leaving ALO to see Asuna, Kayaba, who has uploaded his mind to the Internet using an experimental and destructively high-power version of NerveGear at the cost of his life, entrusts Kirito with The Seed – a package program designed to create virtual worlds. Kazuto eventually reunites with Asuna in the real world and The Seed is released onto the Internet, reviving Aincrad as other VRMMORPGs begin to thrive.

Soon after, at the prompting of a government official investigating strange occurrences in VR, Kazuto takes on a job to investigate a series of murders involving another VRMMORPG called Gun Gale Online (GGO), the AmuSphere (the successor of the NerveGear), and a player called Death Gun. Aided by a female player named Shino "Sinon" Asada, he participates in a gunfight tournament called the Bullet of Bullets (BoB) and discovers the truth behind the murders, which originated with a player who participated in a player-killing guild in SAO. Through his and Sinon's efforts, two suspects are captured, though the third suspect, Johnny Black, escapes.

Kazuto is later recruited to assist in testing an experimental FullDive machine, Soul Translator (STL), which has an interface that is far more realistic and complex than the previous machine he had played to help develop an artificial intelligence for the Ministry of Defense (MOD) named A.L.I.C.E. He tests the STL by entering a virtual reality cyberspace created with The Seed package, named UnderWorld (UW). In the UW, the flow of time proceeds a thousand times faster than in the real world, and Kirito's memories of what happens inside are restricted. However, Black injures Kazuto with suxamethonium chloride. The MOD recovers Kazuto and places him back into the STL to preserve his mind while attempts are made to save him. Meanwhile, it is revealed that UnderWorld was created as part of an experiment to create artificial intelligence that could be used for military purposes.

Kirito makes a cameo appearance in the eighth episode of the anime series Eromanga Sensei, with Yoshitsugu Matsuoka reprising his role.

Reception

Critical commentary

In a review, Richard Eisenbeis of Kotaku hailed Sword Art Online as the smartest series in recent years; Eisenbeis particularly noted how the romance between Kirito and Asuna is explored bringing "definition to exactly what love is like in a virtual world." However, the two characters' relationship in the second half of the novels was criticized, with Eisenbeis complaining about Asuna being deregulated to a damsel in distress stock character for Kirito to fight for, lamenting that the "strong female lead" had been "reduced to nothing but the quest item the male lead is hunting for." The love triangle between Kirito and the other female characters was also scrutinized; Eisenbeis considered it "ludicrous" that Kirito would consider abandoning Asuna, especially considering his devotion to her in the previous storyline. Nevertheless, Kirito was considered a likable and "fun" character.

In response to criticism directed at the series that Kirito was a "Mary Sue" type character, Karen Mead of Japanator.com wrote that "I don't think we ever see enough of Kirito's weaknesses to balance out his strengths: he's pretty much a genius at video games, as well as a kind, giving person, and those are some pretty major positives." However, she praised the positive aspects of Kirito's character, and his "competent and noble" self distinguishes him from other harem protagonists in that he actually earns the girls' affection. Carly Smith of The Escapist criticized Sword Art Online II and compared it unfavourably to the original storyline, summarizing "welcome to Sword Art Online II: the show where everyone loves Kirito and nothing matters", and that the anime doesn't "start to shine" until "Kirito is pushed to the sidelines". In an interview with Bryce Papenbrook, Kirito's English voice actor, when asked whether he would pick Kirito or Eren Yeager (whom he also voiced) from Attack on Titan in a fight, Papenbrook joked that "Inside a game, obviously Kirito would win, because he has God Mode running at all times. I think in real life, Kirito is strong-willed and passionate, but I think Eren would slice him up in real life. He's just too crazy."

Popularity

Kirito is one of the most popular characters in Sword Art Online. In a poll by anime website Charapedia, 10,000 respondents voted on their favorite couples in anime, with Kirito and Asuna topping the list.  Additionally, a Chinese website, bilibili, took a reader poll to find the most "moe" characters of 2015; Kirito placed sixth in the male top 8 and Asuna third in the female top 8. Asuna and Kirito were awarded first and second respectively in a character poll by Dengeki Bunko (the publisher of Sword Art Online) for their light novels. Asuna and Kirito once again made a list of the "[Top] 7 Couples Who Make Love and War" by Anime News Network, writing "love blossoms on the virtual battlefield and the two wed before taking on the game's creator together. The August 2014 issue of Newtype published results of a recent character popularity poll, with Kirito placing 1st overall for male characters; Asuna placed 4th for all female characters. Another poll which would decide the characters placed on a Sword Art Online artbook had Kirito placed in fourth place. "Kazuto" (Kirito) was also fourth on a list of the "top 20 anime characters Japanese fans would name their children after"; "Asuna" placed first. Italian restaurant La Ricetta in Zama, Kanagawa features pancakes prepared with anime and video game character art, including Kirito and Asuna.

Merchandise
The character has received positive critical reception, and his popularity has led to him being featured in several promotional efforts and merchandise of the series. Kirito makes an appearance in an April 2015 campaign which promotes Namco gaming arcades. Fan-made replicas of  Asuna's "Lambent Light" and Kirito's "Elucidator" rapiers have been built by the Man At Arms team of blacksmiths and craftsmen. There are also Kirito, Asuna, and Sinon Sword Art Online-branded perfumes for sale; "Kirito" is described as "dry citrus with a touch of brandy, meant to evoke a mature spirit. It uses green apple, apricot and lime above Muguet, Rose, Jasmine, grapefruit and a musk and brandy base." Sword Art Online glasses based on the characters had a "Kirito" model; "these matte black frames feature a cross and the excalibur on each arm [of the glasses]." A series of anime-inspired Christmas cards featured characters such as Rin Matsuoka from Free!, Godoka from Puella Magi Madoka Magica, and Kirito. He has also appeared in several Sword Art Online-related video games. This includes Dengeki Bunko: Fighting Climax, in which several characters appearing under the Dengeki Bunko imprint are featured. In a costume swap between video games Sword Art Online: Lost Song and God Eater 2: Rage Burst, Lost Song received a Julius costume for Kirito and an Alisa costume for Asuna whilst Rage Burst received costumes of Kirito and Sinon. Asuna, Kirito and Leafa appeared in a campaign by the "Manga Anime Guardians" project in combating anime and manga piracy, with the  project being supported by 15 anime production studios and manga publishers.

See also

 List of Sword Art Online characters

References

External links
Characters at the Sword Art Online official Japanese website
Characters at the Sword Art Online official North American website
Kirito at IMDb

Anime and manga characters who use magic
Fictional bounty hunters
Adoptee characters in anime and manga
Fictional activists
Fictional electronic engineers
Fictional characters from Kantō
Fictional characters with neurotrauma
Literary characters introduced in 2009
Fictional swordfighters in anime and manga
Fictional characters with eidetic memory
Fictional Japanese people in anime and manga
Fictional characters with post-traumatic stress disorder
Fictional kendoka
Fictional sole survivors
Fictional inventors
Fictional vigilantes
Male characters in anime and manga
Orphan characters in anime and manga
Teenage characters in anime and manga
Sword Art Online characters